Bashar is a given name, surname, and place name. Bashar may refer to:

Places
 Bashar, Iran, a village in Qazvin Province, Iran
 Bashar, Plateau State, a village in the Wase local Government Area of Plateau State In Nigeria
 Béchar, the capital city of Béchar Province, Algeria

People

Given name
 Bashar Abdullah (born 1977), Kuwaiti footballer
 Bashar al-Assad (born 1965), President of Syria
 Bashar Jaafari (born 1956), Syrian diplomat
Bashar Barakah Jackson (1999–2020), American rapper
 Bashar Lulua, Berlin-based Arab orchestra conductor
 Bashar Masri (born 1961), Palestinian American entrepreneur 
 Bashar Rahal (born 1974), Bulgarian actor of Lebanese descent
 Bashar Rasan (born 1996), Iraqi footballer
 Bashar al-Shatti (born 1982), also known as Basharno, Beesho and Maystro, Kuwaiti singer, songwriter and actor
 Bashar Shbib (born 1959), Syrian Canadian filmmaker 
 Bashar Srour (born 1972), Syrian footballer
 Bashar al-Zoubi,  Free Syrian Army general
 Bashar Warda (born 1969), Iraqi Chaldean Catholic cleric and Archbishop

Surname
 Caresse Bashar (born 1976), Syrian film and TV actress
 Habibul Bashar (born 1972), Bangladeshi cricketer
 Khademul Bashar (1935–1976), Bangladeshi air marshal

Title
 Abul Bashar, Bangladeshi writer 
 Bashar ibn Burd (714–783) nicknamed "al-Mura'ath", poet in the late Umayyad and the early Abbasid periods
 Haji Bashar, convicted former Afghan drug lord

Others
 Bashar language, an alternative name for Yankam language, a moribund Plateau language of Nigeria
 Bashar (Dune), a fictional military rank in the Dune universe
 Ya Bashar, studio album by Lebanese recording artist Diana Haddad

See also
 Başar, a Turkish male given name and surname
 Basha (disambiguation)

Arabic masculine given names
Arabic-language surnames